The Memorial Artemio Franchi was a summer association football friendly tournament that took place twice, in the Stadio Artemio Franchi, Florence, Italy, in 2008 and 2009. The tournament began as a proposal by the Italian club ACF Fiorentina. The main reason for conducting the tournament he based on the significant contribution of Artemio Franchi in the soccer world, being at the time vice president of FIFA, and UEFA president.

Titles

References

External links
 Official Site 
 Artemio Franchi Trophy at Rec.Sport.Soccer Statistics Foundation.

Defunct Italian football friendly trophies
2008–09 in Italian football
2008–09 in Spanish football
2009–10 in Italian football
2009–10 in French football
ACF Fiorentina